Florin Dorin Acsinte (born 10 April 1987) is a former Romanian footballer who played as a left back. Currently he is the assistant coach of Romanian club Dante Botoșani.

Career
After a number of impressive performances for the Dinamo București reserve team in his short loan spell, Acsinte was wished to get first-team experience but the two clubs couldn't reach an agreement on transfer fee.

Personal life
He is a husband and father.  Acsinte stated that he and his family sympathize with Steaua București.

Honours
FC Botoșani
Liga II: 2012–13
FC Voluntari
Romanian Cup: 2016–17
Romanian Supercup: 2017

References

External links

Living people
1987 births
Sportspeople from Botoșani
Romanian footballers
Association football defenders
Liga I players
Liga II players
FC Botoșani players
CS Pandurii Târgu Jiu players
FC Voluntari players
FC Hermannstadt players
21st-century Romanian people